Rebbachisaurus (meaning "Aït Rebbach lizard") is a genus of sauropod dinosaur of the superfamily Diplodocoidea, that lived during the Late Cretaceous period in Africa and possibly also South America about 99-97 million years ago. Remains attributed to Rebbachisaurus have been found in Morocco, Niger, Algeria, Tunisia and possibly also Argentina (if Rayososaurus is the same animal as Rebbachisaurus), although only the Moroccan remains can be referred to the genus without doubt. The discovery of Rayososaurus, a South American sauropod nearly identical to Rebbachisaurus which may have actually have been the same animal as Rebbachisaurus, supports the theory that there was still a land connection between Africa and South America during the Early Cretaceous, long after it was commonly thought the two continents had separated.

History of discovery

Between 8 October 1948 and 3 January 1952, Rene Lavocat collected the holotype of Rebbachisaurus garasbae (MNHN-MRS 1958), which consists of ten ribs, the right shoulder blade, eleven vertebrae, the sacrum, a humerus, and two bones probably belonging to the pelvis, in the Aoufous Formation at Gara Sbaa, Errachidia in Morocco. He named the type species R. garasbae during the same year but only the shoulder blade and a single vertebra from the string of eleven were initially described, very briefly and without illustrations. The fossils were left undescribed and neglected until 2015, when Jeffrey Wilson and Ronan Allain cleaned the holotype and described the remaining fossils that Lavocat never described in 1954.

A second species was named by de Lapparent in 1960, Rebbachisaurus tamesnensis. The type specimen, collected by Lapparent in the Continental intercalaire Formation (initially believed to have been found in the Gall locality, Tiourarén Formation) of Niger, supposedly composed of two humeri and two femora, and a second specimen composed of four isolated teeth, a dentary fragment with three teeth, over 100 vertebrae, six chevrons, 12 ribs, 5 scapulae, an ilium, two ischia, and numerous limb elements, but however, the material of this taxon was collected from multiple localities across the Sahara, such as several sites in the Elrhaz Formation of Niger, and is not referrable to Rebbachisaurus.

A third species was named by Calvo and Salgado in 1995, Rebbachisaurus tessonei. It was discovered in the Candeleros Formation in Argentina, near to where the holotype of Giganotosaurus carolinii was discovered. This species was later moved to the new genus Limaysaurus in 2004.

It is often believed that the rebbachisaurid Rayososaurus agrioensis, named by Jose Bonaparte in 1996, is synonymous with Rebbachisaurus garasbae. Rayososaurus is extremely similar to Rebbachisaurus and there is some debate as to whether Rayososaurus is indeed a separate genus. However, morphological and temporal differences tend to support the distinction, as Rayososaurus is known from the Candeleros Formation of Argentina, while Rebbachisaurus is known from the Aoufous Formation of Morocco.

Description 

In 2020 Molina-Pérez and Larramendi gave a larger estimation of 26 meters (85.3 ft) and 40 tonnes (44 short tons). It possessed a small head, a long, graceful neck and a whiplike tail. Rebbachisaurus is distinguished from other sauropods by its unusually tall, ridged back and the spine or sail that lay atop its back, distinguished by the tall ridges of the preserved dorsal vertebrae of the holotype and other specimens.

Classification 
Below is a cladogram following the 2013 analysis by Fanti and colleagues, which confirmed the placement of Rebbachisaurus as a basal rebbachisaurid.

A 2015 cladistic study by Wilsona and the French palaeontologist Ronan Allain found Rebbachisaurus itself to group with the nigersaurines, and the authors suggested that Nigersaurinae was therefore a junior synonym of Rebbachisaurinae (since that name would have priority).

Paleoecology

The most common vertebrates which coexisted alongside R. garasbae in the Aoufous belong to the elasmobranch fish Onchopristis numidus. Another seven elasmobranchs are reported: Asteracanthus aegyptiacus, Distobatus nutiae, Tribodus sp., Lissodus sp., Haimirichia amonensis, Cretoxyrhinidae indet., and Marckgrafia lybica. Lungfish fossils referred to Ceratodus humei and Neoceratodus africanus are known to have coexisted alongside Rebbachisaurus and the coelacanths Mawsonia lavocati Axelrodichthys also coexisted with Rebbachisaurus. Several taxa of Cladistia and two genera of seminiomorphs (an unnamed Lepidotes-like species and Oniichthys falipoui) are known to have coexisted with Rebbachisaurus in the Aoufous Formation. Teleosteans are represented by Cladocyclus pankowskii, Palaeonotopterus greenwoodi, Erfoudichthys rosae and Concavotectum moroccensis. Amphibians are also present: Kababisha sp., the pipid frog Oumtkoutia anae and non-pipids frogs. Turtles are represented by several species: Dirqadim schaefferi, the podocnemidids Hamadachelys escuilliei, the bothremydids Galianemys whitei and G. emringeri, and the araripemydids Araripemys sp. Crocodilians are commonly found; four species are present: Elosuchus cherifiensis, a genus that belonged to the Trematochampsidae, Araripesuchus rattoides and Laganosuchus maghrebensis.

Rebbachisaurus garasbae coexisted with many dinosaurs, including an ornithischian and an unnamed basal theropod, both only known from footprints. Among theropods, two carcharodontosaurids (Carcharodontosaurus saharicus and Sauroniops pachytholus), one spinosaurid (Spinosaurus aegyptiacus), one coelurosaur (Deltadromeus agilis), an unnamed abelisaur and an unnamed dromaeosaur also coexisted with Rebbachisaurus.

Pterosaurs are also present, although their fossils are extremely rare and enigmatic: an azhdarchid, an ornithocheirid, a tapejarid and a pteranodontid are known to have coexisted with Rebbachisaurus.

References 

Rebbachisaurids
Cenomanian life
Late Cretaceous dinosaurs of Africa
Cretaceous Morocco
Fossils of Morocco
Fossil taxa described in 1954
Taxa named by René Lavocat